Lyte may refer to:

 Electrolyte
 Lyte (surname), multiple people with the surname
 Lyte Records, British record label
 Thomas Lyte, English company making silverware, gifts and trophies

See also
Light (disambiguation)
Lite (disambiguation)